Sylvan Ponds are two small lakes north of Bisby Lodge in Herkimer County, New York. The southern lake drains south via an unnamed creek which flows into First Lake.

See also
 List of lakes in New York

References 

Lakes of New York (state)
Lakes of Herkimer County, New York